This is a list of lists of serial killers.

 List of serial killers by country
 List of serial killers in Colombia
 List of French serial killers
 List of German serial killers
 List of Russian serial killers
 List of serial killers in the United Kingdom
 List of serial killers in the United States
 List of serial killers by number of victims: Includes only killers active after 1900
 List of serial killers before 1900
 List of serial killers active in the 2020s
List of nicknames of serial killers
List of Soviet and post-Soviet serial killers nicknamed after Andrei Chikatilo